The Merry Wives of Windsor (German:Die lustigen Weiber von Windsor) is a 1918 German silent comedy film directed by William Wauer. It is an adaptation of William Shakespeare's The Merry Wives of Windsor.

Cast
In alphabetical order
 Gretl Basch as Frau Fluth  
 Jacques Bilk as Herr Fluth  
 Robert Blass as Falstaff 
 Edwin Heyer as Cajus 
 Luise Mark-Lüders as Frau Reich  
 Ludwig Rex as Herr Reich 
 Elisabeth Schott as Anna  
 Harry Steier as Junker Spärlich  
 Karl Tannert as Fenton

References

Bibliography 
 Eddie Sammons. Shakespeare: A Hundred Years on Film. Scarecrow Press, 2004.

External links 
 

1918 films
German historical comedy films
German silent feature films
1910s historical comedy films
Films based on The Merry Wives of Windsor
German films based on plays
Films directed by William Wauer
German black-and-white films
1918 comedy films
Silent historical comedy films
1910s German films
1910s German-language films